Şaka ile Karışık is a 1965 Turkish comedy film directed by Osman F. Seden.

Cast 
 Sadri Alışık as Ofsayt Osman
 Filiz Akın as Şarkıcı Filiz
 Ajda Pekkan as Ayla
 Efgan Efekan as Yazar Kemal
 Kadir Savun as Hüsrev Ağa
 Vahi Öz as Cellat Nuri
 Aziz Basmacı
 Hüseyin Baradan
 Nubar Terziyan
 Hulusi Kentmen as Hulisi

External links 

1965 comedy films
1965 films
Turkish comedy films